Obersturmmann was a paramilitary rank of the NSDAP which existed from 1931 to 1945.  Translated as "Senior Storm Trooper", the rank of Obersturmmann was considered the equivalent of a Private First Class.  The rank of Obersturmmann can trace its origins to World War I where the position was held by low level non-commissioned officers who served as fire team leaders in Stormtrooper companies.

Very few Nazi Party groups maintained the rank of Obersturmmann and the title typically appeared in organizations (such as the National Socialist Motor Corps) which did not maintain the rank of Mann.  The rank ceased to exist in 1945 and has never again appeared in the German military, primarily due to its connection with Nazi Germany.

Nazi paramilitary ranks